The year of 2018 was designated to be the European Year of Cultural Heritage by the European Commission. 

Announced in 2017, it was officially launched on January 31, 2018.

To this initiative are participating 28 European countries.

References

2018 in Europe
European culture
Cultural heritage of Europe 
European Commission
Themed years of the European Union